Coccidiphila is a genus of moths in the family Cosmopterigidae.

Species
Coccidiphila danilevskyi Sinev, 1997 (from Europe and North Africa)
Coccidiphila gerasimovi Danilevsky, 1950 (Mediterranean area, Canaries, Caucasus)
Coccidiphila kasypinkeri Traugott-Olsen, 1986 (from the Canaries)
Coccidiphila ledereriella (Zeller, 1850) (Southern Europe and South Africa)
Coccidiphila nivea Koster, 2010 (from the United Arab Emirates)
Coccidiphila patriciae Nel & Nel, 2000 (from the Canaries)
Coccidiphila riedli Traugott-Olsen, 1986 (from the Canaries)
Coccidiphila silvatica (Meyrick, 1917) (India, Kumaon)
Coccidiphila stegodyphobius (Walsingham, 1903) (from South Africa)
Coccidiphila violenta (Meyrick, 1916) (Guyana)

References
Coccidiphila at Fauna Europaea
Coccidiphila at Afro Moths

Cosmopteriginae